Jabu Jeremiah Mahlangu (formerly Jabu Jeremiah Pule) (born 11 July 1980 in Daveyton, Gauteng) is a retired South African football (soccer) midfielder who last played for Supersport United.

Club career

South Africa
Pule's first club was Kaizer Chiefs. The club refused to renew his contract when it ended in 2004 due to unprofessional conduct. He began playing for SV Mattersburg, but after eight months, he was asked to leave the club after crashing his car while under the influence of alcohol.

Twice sent to a rehabilitation clinic to overcome his problems with drinking and drugs, Pule was sacked by SuperSport United in late 2005 after missing several training sessions.

Irvin Khoza, chairman of Orlando Pirates, signed the former South Africa international, who had been kicked out of three previous clubs. In early 2006, Jabu Pule changed his surname to Mahlangu, the name of his deceased father.

Sweden
Pule left South Africa on 23 June 2008 for trials with Swedish clubs Helsingborgs IF, IF Limhamn Bunkeflo, and Östers IF, after training under the guidance of Farouk Khan at his academy in South Africa.

He completed 13 games for Östers IF in Division 1 Södra as the team came close to promotion into Superettan, with none of the problematic behaviour that had previously marred his career.

On 18 February 2010, Jabu signed a one-year contract with now Superettan newcomers Östers IF.

International career
Jabu made 20 appearances for the South Africa national football team from 2000 to 2004, and was a participant at the 2002 FIFA World Cup and at the 2000 Olympic Games. During the team's departure for the World Cup, South African president Thabo Mbeki, while shaking hands with the players to wish them good luck, said to him: "Jabu, you must behave yourself".

He was not selected for the South African squad in the 2010 World Cup in South Africa, due to his behavior.

Career statistics

International goals

References

External links

Guardian's Stats Centre

1980 births
Living people
People from Daveyton
South African soccer players
South African expatriate soccer players
South Africa international soccer players
Olympic soccer players of South Africa
Footballers at the 2000 Summer Olympics
2002 FIFA World Cup players
2004 African Cup of Nations players
Association football midfielders
Kaizer Chiefs F.C. players
SuperSport United F.C. players
Orlando Pirates F.C. players
SV Mattersburg players
Platinum Stars F.C. players
Östers IF players
Expatriate footballers in Sweden
Sportspeople from Gauteng